Jonesboro is a city in and the county seat of Clayton County, Georgia, United States. The population was 4,724 as of the 2010 census.

The city's name was originally spelled Jonesborough. During the Civil War, the final skirmish in the Atlanta Campaign was fought here south of Atlanta, cutting off the city and forcing the mayor of Atlanta to surrender at Marietta in early September 1864. The final fall of Atlanta in the Battle of Jonesborough ended up being a decisive point in the nation's history, propelling Abraham Lincoln to re-election two months later, and continuing the war until the Confederacy finally surrendered the following year.

Geography

Jonesboro is located at  (33.524512, -84.354290).

The railroad through Jonesboro is built on the Eastern Continental Divide and there are no bridges for the tracks for many miles in either direction.

Climate

Infrastructure

Transit systems
MARTA and Xpress GA/Georgia RTA buses serve the city.

Demographics

2020 census

As of the 2020 United States census, there were 4,235 people, 1,195 households, and 771 families residing in the city.

2000 census
As of the census of 2000, there were 3,829 people, 1,466 households, and 1,023 families residing in the city. The racial composition of the city was 72.79% African American, 20.63% White, 0.21% Native American, 0.73% Asian, 0.31% Pacific Islander, 3.45% from other races, and 1.88% from two or more races. Hispanic or Latino of any race were 7.55% of the population. In the past 2 years that population has doubled to about 15.86%.

There were 1,466 households, out of which 34.1% had children under the age of 18 living with them, 38.6% were married couples living together, 25.6% had a female householder with no husband present, and 30.2% were non-families. 25.5% of all households were made up of individuals, and 11.5% had someone living alone who was 65 years of age or older.  The average household size was 2.60 and the average family size was 3.09.

In the city, the population was spread out, with 29.2% under the age of 18, 9.6% from 18 to 24, 29.6% from 25 to 44, 19.2% from 45 to 64, and 12.4% who were 65 years of age or older.  The median age was 32 years. For every 100 females, there were 84.1 males.  For every 100 females age 18 and over, there were 78.1 males.

The median income for a household in the city was $31,951, and the median income for a family was $39,143. Males had a median income of $29,236 versus $25,797 for females. The per capita income for the city was $16,178.  About 19.2% of families and 20.2% of the population were below the poverty line, including 33.9% of those under age 18 and 19.7% of those age 65 or over.

History

Jonesboro was founded as Leaksville in 1823. In 1846, the Macon and Western Railroad arrived into the area and the town was renamed in honor of railroad official Samuel G. Jones.

Jonesboro was incorporated in 1859.

Jonesboro hosted the beach volleyball at the 1996 Summer Olympics with the artificial beach created at Clayton County International Park.

Notable people
 Dan T. Cathy (born 1953), CEO of Chick-fil-A
 Chidi "Chi Chi" Osondu, Nigerian-American record producer and songwriter
 Tashard Choice, former running back in National Football League
 Harry Douglas, former NFL wide receiver 
 Toney Douglas (born 1986), basketball player for Hapoel Eilat of the Israeli Basketball Premier League
 Jesse Fuller, Afro-American blues musician
 Sister Mary Melanie Holliday, Catholic nun
 Steve Lundquist, two-time gold medal swimmer in 1984 Olympics
 Thomas Milton Rivers, bacteriologist and virologist with the Rockefeller Institute, Rear Admiral of the U.S. Navy
 Adam Smith (born 1992), basketball player for Hapoel Holon in the Israel Basketball Premier League
 Annie Fitzgerald Stephens, landowner and businesswoman, grandmother of Margaret Mitchell
 Cameron Sutton, cornerback for the Pittsburgh Steelers
 M. J. Walker, shooting guard for Florida State

Movies and literature
Many of the scenes from the 1977 film Smokey and the Bandit were filmed in Jonesboro. Another 1977 movie, the obscure 'In Hot Pursuit (aka The Polk County Pot Plane), was filmed in and around Jonesboro.

Tara, the fictional plantation in Margaret Mitchell's novel Gone with the Wind was supposed to be located approximately five miles outside of Jonesboro, the closest town.

"We Are Marshall" was briefly filmed at Tara Stadium in Jonesboro. The stadium was changed from green to light blue and light yellow for the scene.

Lynyrd Skynyrd's (pronounced 'lĕh-'nérd 'skin-'nérd) album cover was photographed near the corner of Mill and Main streets.

Landmark
Rural Home (now demolished}
Stately Oaks

Education
Clayton County Public Schools operates public schools.

References

External links
 
 City of Jonesboro

Cities in Georgia (U.S. state)
Cities in Clayton County, Georgia
County seats in Georgia (U.S. state)
Cities in the Atlanta metropolitan area